Brighton is a city near Birmingham, Alabama, United States and located just east of Hueytown. At the 2020 census, the population was 2,337. It is part of the Birmingham-Hoover Metropolitan Statistical Area, which in 2010 had a population of about 1,128,047, approximately one-quarter of Alabama's population.

It is one of four cities in Jefferson County named after cities in Great Britain. Many of the city's early settlers were of English descent; they named the town after the English tourist and resort city of Brighton, which is located on the English Channel.

Geography

History
Brighton was not settled by European Americans until the late 19th century.  Brighton was officially founded in 1892, when developer G.B. Edwards subdivided a tract of land and sold lots. It was named after Brighton, East Sussex in England UK. It was situated along a dummy railroad line built in 1889 by the Bessemer & Birmingham Railroad Company to connect those two growing industrial cities.

The Old Huntsville Road was renamed as Main Street and the city was incorporated in 1901. By that year, at least 100 families were living in Brighton. The town had a population of 1,502 by the 1910 census, with seventeen commercial establishments, including eight grocery stores.

The city's fortunes have been closely linked to those of Woodward Iron Company. Together with coal mining in this area, the iron company was integral to the industrial development in this part of Alabama, which is based on the much larger cities of Birmingham, Bessemer, and Gadsden. After industrial restructuring in the late 1970s and when the iron company moved out, the town has declined in population since its peak in 1980.

Brighton Cemetery, which is still operating, contains the graves of persons of Scottish, English and German descent who came to work at Woodward.

In August 1908, coal miner and union leader William Miller, who was black, was accused of blowing up the home of a white mine operator Finley Fuller. It was during a period of labor unrest as mine workers tried to organize unions. Miller was lynched by a white mob that dragged him out of the Brighton jail. They hanged and killed him not far from Brighton City Hall. Later, it was found that whites opposed to unionization had bombed Fuller's home; by linking the crime to a black man, they intended to increase general opposition to the union's drive for better wages.

In 2015, after the Equal Justice Initiative (EJI) published its study Lynching in America: Confronting the Legacy of Racial Terror, the city of Brighton resolved to place a historical marker to commemorate Miller for his work with the union and as a victim of lynching. They worked in cooperation with EJI and placed the marker in a ceremony near City Hall. Brighton was the first city in Alabama to install such a memorial. In a related effort, scholarships will be awarded to high school students for writing essays about Alabama's racial history.

City government
Brighton has a Mayor–council government. It operates both police and fire departments.

Demographics

2000 census
At the 2000 census, there were 3,640 people, 1,413 households, and 921 families living in the city. The racial makeup of the city was 9.01% White, 89.12% Black or African American, 0.38% Native American, 0.03% Asian, 0.03% Pacific Islander, 0.88% from other races, and 0.55% from two or more races. 1.73% of the population were Hispanic or Latino of any race.

Of the 1,413 households 25.9% had children under the age of 18 living with them, 29.9% were married couples living together, 29.9% had a female householder with no husband present, and 34.8% were non-families. 32.5% of households were one person and 14.7% were one person aged 65 or older. The average household size was 2.57 and the average family size was 3.29.

The age distribution was 25.5% under the age of 18, 10.3% from 18 to 24, 26.0% from 25 to 44, 21.8% from 45 to 64, and 16.3% 65 or older. The median age was 38 years. For every 100 females, there were 87.0 males. For every 100 females age 18 and over, there were 78.9 males.

The median household income was $21,364 and the median family income  was $27,926. Males had a median income of $24,018 versus $20,192 for females. The per capita income for the city was $11,002. About 20.2% of families and 27.2% of the population were below the poverty line, including 38.3% of those under age 18 and 20.3% of those age 65 or over.

2010 census
At the 2010 census, there were 2,945 people, 1,105 households, and 696 families living in the city. The racial makeup of the city was 81.0% Black or African American, 6.5% White, 1.0% Native American, 0.0% Asian, 0.0% Pacific Islander, 10.8% from other races, and 0.9% from two or more races. 13.8% of the population were Hispanic or Latino of any race.

Of the 1,105 households 21.7% had children under the age of 18 living with them, 24.6% were married couples living together, 31.9% had a female householder with no husband present, and 37.0% were non-families. 32.8% of households were one person and 12.4% were one person aged 65 or older. The average household size was 2.64 and the average family size was 3.39.

The age distribution was 22.8% under the age of 18, 11.5% from 18 to 24, 23.4% from 25 to 44, 27.2% from 45 to 64, and 15.1% 65 or older. The median age was 38 years. For every 100 females, there were 94.0 males. For every 100 females age 18 and over, there were 102.1 males.

The median household income was $25,929 and the median family income  was $31,472. Males had a median income of $20,838 versus $28,250 for females. The per capita income for the city was $14,858. About 14.1% of families and 16.6% of the population were below the poverty line, including 19.6% of those under age 18 and 21.9% of those age 65 or over.

2020 census

As of the 2020 United States census, there were 2,337 people, 1,180 households, and 519 families residing in the city.

Notable people
Charles Avery (1892–1974), blues and boogie-woogie pianist
Parnell Dickinson, former professional football player
Albert Hall, stage, TV and film actor
Henry Panion, music director for Stevie Wonder, Whitney Houston, and the Winans
Josephus C. Vines, mayor of Brighton
Dennis Weatherby, inventor, scientist, and university administrator

References

Cities in Alabama
Cities in Jefferson County, Alabama
Birmingham metropolitan area, Alabama
Populated places established in 1892